Kylo Ren is a fictional character in the Star Wars franchise. He first appeared as the primary antagonist of Star Wars: The Force Awakens (2015), in which he is portrayed by Adam Driver. Driver reprised his role in the sequel films Star Wars: The Last Jedi (2017) and Star Wars: The Rise of Skywalker (2019), with the character also appearing in Star Wars Resistance (2018–2020), The Lego Star Wars Holiday Special (2020) and LEGO Star Wars Terrifying Tales (2021).

Kylo Ren is the chosen name of Ben Solo, the child of original Star Wars trilogy characters Han Solo and Princess Leia Organa  Skywalker. Though initially trained as a Jedi by his uncle Luke Skywalker, Ben was seduced to the dark side of the Force by Supreme Leader Snoke, and aspires to be as powerful as his grandfather, the Sith Lord Darth Vader / Anakin  Skywalker.  Throughout the sequel trilogy, Kylo Ren serves as the master of the Knights of Ren, a warlord of the First Order, and both an adversary and romantic interest to Rey. After he kills Snoke and usurps his position as Supreme Leader, Ren discovers that he shares a connection with Rey called a 'Force dyad' and is eventually redeemed like his grandfather when he sacrifices himself to help Rey defeat the revived Emperor Palpatine.

In addition to appearing in the films and television series, Kylo Ren has also appeared in related media and merchandising. Driver's performance has received acclaim from critics and fans. For his performance in The Force Awakens, Driver won the Saturn Award for Best Supporting Actor, making him the first Star Wars actor since Alec Guinness to win the award. Driver received a second nomination in the same category for his performance in The Rise of Skywalker.

Concept and creation
Abrams requested that the character's mask be designed to be memorable to a child. As late as March 2014, the film's main antagonist was only known to the production team as "Jedi Killer", and had gone through numerous unapproved design attempts, one of which was reused for Captain Phasma. The same month, Glyn Dillon's design for the character's costume was finally approved. According to Abrams, "the design was meant to be a nod to the Vader mask," and concept designer Doug Chiang says that the character "takes on [the] persona of [Vader] to haunt Luke." According to The Force Awakens costume designer Michael Kaplan,

Driver's casting in the film in an unnamed role was first announced on April 29, 2014. Kylo Ren was first seen from behind, but still not named, in the 88-second The Force Awakens teaser trailer released by Lucasfilm on November 28, 2014, wielding a jagged red lightsaber with a crossguard. The name Kylo Ren, as well as the character's design, was revealed by Entertainment Weekly in a Lucasfilm-designed Topps-style trading card mock-up on December 11, 2014; a character named "Kybo Ren" was previously featured in the 1985 animated series Star Wars: Droids. A May 2015 Vanity Fair photo shoot by Annie Leibovitz confirmed that Driver would be portraying Kylo.

According to other cast members, Driver is a method actor, which meant that he sometimes stayed in character on set as Ren and left his mask on between scenes. Driver explained that his goal was "to forget you're in Star Wars and treat it like any other job that's filled with moments and problems," because from the perspective of the characters living within the film's universe, "Darth Vader is real."

Character
Abrams told Empire in August 2015, "Kylo Ren is not a Sith. He works under Supreme Leader Snoke, who is a powerful figure on the dark side of the Force." Abrams had previously stated that the character "came to the name Kylo Ren when he joined a group called the Knights of Ren." Robbie Collin of The Telegraph described Ren as "a hot-headed, radicalised dark side jihadi, whose red lightsaber splutters and crackles as violently as his temper". Abrams noted, "The lightsaber is something that he built himself, and is as dangerous and as fierce and as ragged as the character." The Telegraph also explains that Ren's wild and erratic temper and "angsty" instability make him dangerous. Melissa Leon of The Daily Beast describes Ren's use of the Force as "formidable", citing his ability to stop a blaster shot mid-air, immobilize victims and probe their minds against their will.

Kasdan told Entertainment Weekly in August 2015, "I've written four Star Wars movies now, and there's never been a character quite like the one that Adam plays. I think you're going to see something that's brand new to the saga," noting that the character is "full of emotion". Abrams explained, "I think that what makes Ren so unique is that he isn't as fully formed as when we meet a character such as Darth Vader ... He is not your prototypical mustache-twirling bad guy. He is a little bit more complex than that." Driver said in December 2015 that, despite the visual similarities to Darth Vader, Ren is "unlike any villain the franchise has seen". He explained:

Driver claimed that he was privy to several details of Kylo Ren's backstory during the making of the films. According to Lev Grossman, who interviewed the actor in the lead-up to The Rise of Skywalker, Driver reported that “both Han Solo and Leia were way too self-absorbed and into this idea of themselves as heroes to really be attentive parents in the way a young and tender Kylo Ren really needed.” The backstory of how Ben Solo became Kylo Ren was elaborated upon in a prequel graphic novel titled The Rise of Kylo Ren (written by Charles Soule and illustrated by Will Sliney), which was published and released by Marvel Comics from December 18, 2019 to March 11, 2020.

Certain aspects of Kylo Ren's overall arc across the three films of the Sequel Trilogy were also known to Driver from the start of production on the first film. He claimed that he “had one piece of information of where it was all going...and things were building towards that.” He later clarified:

When asked by IGN in December 2017 if he believed Kylo Ren was capable of redemption, The Last Jedi writer/director Rian Johnson replied, "Yeah... Are you kidding? Vader was worse than Kylo ever was, I think, and Vader got redeemed." Citing the complexity of the character, Johnson articulated, “I don’t see the point of trying to get behind his mask and learn more about him if all we’re going to learn is ‘Yeah, he’s just an evil bad guy that needs to be killed.’” The Rise of Skywalker co-writer Chris Terrio also supported this position through comparing Kylo with Darth Vader. According to Terrio, “Vader was complicit in genocide and cruelty and depravity. Yet there is this inherent optimism in Star Wars that the light in you is never truly gone. That you can still redeem yourself right up until the last minute – which, in Vader's case, was literally true... Leia never really gave up hope that Kylo could be redeemed, and she knew that Rey was probably the way that it would happen.” Abrams further elaborated on this point:

The Rise of Skywalker revealed that Kylo Ren and Rey were two halves of a "dyad" in the Force, which Terrio alternatively described as "sort of soulmate[s] in the Force"  and "twins of fate, twins of destiny." Their relationship was also described as a romance by both J.J. Abrams and Rian Johnson, with Abrams explaining that, during the production of The Force Awakens, he perceived them having as much as a "brother-sister thing" as a "romantic thing" because of their spiritual connection in the Force, while Johnson explains the intimacy developed between the two characters in The Last Jedi because of their interactions during the Force connections. Johnson also explains about Kylo Ren's appeal for Rey to join him during The Last Jedi comparing it with the love confession in the film Notting Hill:

Appearances

The Force Awakens (2015)

Kylo Ren first appears in The Force Awakens as a warlord of the First Order, a tyrannical regime that has risen from the remains of the Galactic Empire. After arriving at Jakku to retrieve a map containing the coordinates where Luke Skywalker (Mark Hamill) is to be found, Ren kills an old priest named Lor San Tekka (Max von Sydow), and captures Resistance pilot Poe Dameron (Oscar Isaac), who has also been sent to recover the map by General Princess Leia Organa (Carrie Fisher). Ren soon learns that the pilot had entrusted his astromech droid, BB-8, with the map. Poe flees with the help of rogue stormtrooper Finn (John Boyega), who later finds BB-8, and the scavenger Rey (Daisy Ridley). Finn, Rey, and BB-8 escape Jakku in the Millennium Falcon, and are soon intercepted by the ship's former owner, Han Solo (Harrison Ford), and his co-pilot Chewbacca (Peter Mayhew).

It is revealed that Ren is the son of Han and Leia, originally named Ben, and was once one of Luke's Jedi pupils. He was corrupted to the dark side of the Force by the First Order's Supreme Leader Snoke (Andy Serkis), and helped destroy Luke's new Jedi Academy. However, Ren still feels the pull of the light side of the Force and seeks the strength to overcome it from his grandfather Darth Vader, whose burnt helmet is in Ren's possession. Arriving at Maz Kanata's (Lupita Nyong'o) castle on Takodana, Ren captures Rey, who he senses has seen the map. While interrogating her, he realizes that she is strong with the Force, though unaware of it. Rey finds herself able to resist his powers and experience Ren's emotions, and confronts him over his fear that he will never be as powerful as his grandfather. She later uses the "Jedi mind trick" to compel her stormtrooper guard to let her escape. Han arrives at the First Order's planet-converted superweapon, Starkiller Base, as part of the Resistance's plan to destroy it.

After Han plants explosives to destroy the base, he confronts Ren calling him by his real name, Ben and implores him to abandon the dark side, warning him that Snoke will kill him once he has control of the galaxy. Ren tells Han he feels conflicted, and asks his father for help, which Han promises to give; Ren accidentally ignites his lightsaber, impaling and killing Han. An angry Chewbacca fires at Ren, wounding him. As Finn and Rey leave the damaged base, Ren pursues and confronts them. Finn fights Ren with Luke Skywalker's lightsaber, but Ren overpowers and severely wounds him. Rey then takes up the lightsaber and, using the Force, begins to overcome Ren, striking him on the face with the lightsaber. Before the duel is finished, they are separated by a seismic fissure created by the collapsing base. Rey and the others escape as Snoke orders General Hux (Domnhall Gleeson) to evacuate the base and bring Ren to him to complete his training.

The Last Jedi (2017)

Ren's inner conflict continues into The Last Jedi, particularly through his conversations with Rey, with whom he connects through the Force. Rey learns from Luke why Ben Solo turned to the dark side: Luke had seen a vision of the destruction Ben would cause and was briefly tempted to kill him in his sleep; when Ben awoke to see Luke with his lightsaber drawn, he turned on his uncle and apparently destroyed the Jedi Temple. Rey believes that there is still good in Ren, and resolves to bring him back to the light side.

Meanwhile, Ren is reproached by Snoke for his failure to defeat Rey, and Ren tries to prove himself by leading an attack on a lead Resistance starship. He hesitates to destroy it after sensing his mother's presence, but his wingmen destroy the ship's bridge, almost killing Leia. Upon Rey's arrival, Ren captures her and brings her to Snoke, who tortures her for Luke's location before ordering Ren to kill her. Instead of complying, Ren uses the Force to ignite Luke's lightsaber at Snoke's side and cut him in half, and subsequently slays Snoke's royal guard with Rey's assistance. After the guards are slain, Ren reveals to Rey his goal to create a new order in the galaxy, separate from the legacies created by Snoke and Luke, and beseeches Rey to join him. He gets her to acknowledge that her parents abandoned her, and tells her that despite her being a nobody that comes from nowhere, he truly cares about her. Rey hesitates and then refuses to join him, realizing that Ren will not turn back to the light side; the two briefly struggle over Luke's lightsaber with the Force, resulting in the weapon breaking in half and knocking both warriors unconscious.

After Rey escapes, Ren frames her for Snoke's assassination, uses the Force to choke Hux until he acknowledges Ren as the new Supreme Leader of the First Order, and orders his forces to attack the Resistance base on Crait. When Luke appears during the attack, Ren orders his men to fire on him, to no effect; Luke remains standing, revealing that he is only present as a Force projection, serving as a distraction to allow the Resistance to escape from the First Order. After Luke vanishes, the First Order storms the base, but the Resistance has already evacuated. Ren shares a final look with Rey through the Force before Rey slams the door to the Millennium Falcon and escapes with the Resistance.

The Rise of Skywalker (2019)

In The Rise of Skywalker, Ren has been ruling as the Supreme Leader of the First Order for a year. In the film's beginning, Ren searches for a Sith wayfinder on the planet Mustafar with an army of stormtroopers to lead him to the Sith planet Exegol, with the hopes of killing the resurrected Emperor Palpatine (Ian McDiarmid) as a show of his power. When Ren finds the wayfinder and arrives on Exegol, Palpatine reveals that he has been manipulating Ren and the First Order, having created Snoke as a means of turning Ren to the dark side. Palpatine unveils the Final Order, a massive armada of Xyston-class Star Destroyers built by the Sith Eternal. Palpatine offers the armada to Ren in a bid to form a new Sith Empire with Ren as Emperor on the condition that he kill Rey.

Ren searches the galaxy for Rey and continues corresponding with her through the Force to discern her location. Rey has been searching for a second wayfinder; Ren tries to stop her from finding it. Eventually, Ren informs Rey that she is Palpatine's granddaughter, and furthermore, they are a dyad in the Force with extremely powerful potential when joined together. He urges her once more to take his hand and to overthrow Palpatine together. Rey refuses, but Ren is unwilling to kill her and follows her to Kef Bir, the location of the second wayfinder. Meeting her on the wreckage of the second Death Star, Ren destroys the second wayfinder and duels her. The duel ends with Rey impaling Ren, who had been distracted by his dying mother, Leia, reaching out to him through the Force. A guilt-ridden Rey (also sensing Leia's death) uses the Force to heal Ren and leaves aboard his ship, after telling him that she wanted to take Ben Solo's hand, but not Kylo Ren's. Alone on the wreckage, Ren converses with a memory of his father, Han Solo; he tosses away his lightsaber, renouncing his role as Supreme Leader and reclaiming his old identity of Ben Solo.

Ben rushes to help Rey defeat Palpatine on Exegol. Rey senses his presence and uses their Force connection to give him Luke's lightsaber, which Ben uses to defeat the Knights of Ren. Palpatine then senses Rey and Ben's connection as a dyad in the Force, and absorbs their energy to restore his full power, before casting Ben into an abyss. However, Rey manages to defeat and kill Palpatine before dying from the effort. Ben climbs out of the abyss and finds Rey's inert body. Ben transfers his life essence into her, successfully resuscitating her but sacrificing his own life in the process. They kiss passionately before Ben dies in Rey's arms. His body fades away simultaneously as his mother's body becomes one with the Force at the Resistance base.

The Lego Star Wars Holiday Special (2020)

In The Lego Star Wars Holiday Special, Rey begins to train Finn as a Jedi while mourning Ben's demise. On the Life Day after his demise, Rey uses a blue-green crystal key from the Jedi Temple on Kordoku to open a portal to the World Between Worlds, a dimension that exists outside of time and space, and travel through time to witness the training methods of Jedi Masters past on the Life Days of different years. After being followed through time by Darth Vader (from shortly before his death during the events of Return of the Jedi), Rey loses the key to him, who delivers it to his time's Palpatine. Intruigued by the concept of knowing his future, Palpatine travels thirty years into his future with Vader to the Life Day between the events of The Last Jedi and The Rise of Skywalker, meeting Supreme Leader Kylo Ren on his ship. Attributing the duo's presence to a "Life Day miracle", Ren eagerly introduces himself to Vader as his grandson, before informing Palpatine of his apparent death at Vader's hand and his own rise as Supreme Leader of the First Order. Unaware of his own subsequent resurrection, Palpatine decides to recruit Ren as his new apprentice, bringing him to his throne room onboard the second Death Star in the past with the intent of having him kill Vader and his time's Luke Skywalker after sending the former to retrieve the latter.

Upon travelling through time to Palpatine's throne room alongside BB-8 and a pre-A New Hope-era Luke in order to retrieve the key, Rey is shocked by Ren's presence, who immediately engages her in a lightsaber duel upon recognising the younger Luke. After being distracted by the arrival of Vader and his time's Luke, Rey throws him into Vader, before enlisting Luke's help to fight the pair; as Ren fights Luke, expressing his hatred for him, Luke expresses puzzlement as to who Ren is. Avoiding Palpatine's Force lightning, Rey is intercepted by Ren; to Rey's and Palpatine's surprise, Ren deactivates his lightsaber and invites her again to rule the galaxy alongside him, as BB-8 steals back the key from Palpatine. A saddened Rey looks at Ren, and addressing him as Ben, uses the key to send him back to his ship in his time, where Ren destroys his room in angry.

Comics

Age of Resistance (2019)
Kylo Ren appears in the Marvel Comics miniseries Age of Resistance, part of the Age of Star Wars maxi-series composed of one-shot issues focusing on various characters from each trilogy in the Skywalker saga. All of his appearances are set prior to The Force Awakens. In his own self-titled issue, Kylo Ren #1, Ren leads a First Order battalion to victory, succeeding in conquering a planet that Darth Vader had failed to bring under the Empire's control in the past.

In Finn #1, Finn briefly encounters Kylo Ren during the former's time as a sanitation worker on Starkiller Base. In General Hux #1, Ren and General Hux are stranded together on a hostile planet and are forced to put their mutual enmity aside in order to survive. Supreme Leader Snoke #1 showcases Ren's training under Snoke, who subjects Ren to various physical and mental torments in order to foster his anger and strength in the dark side of the Force. Snoke takes Ren to Dagobah, where his uncle Luke Skywalker was trained by Yoda decades before. Entering the cave where Luke once faced a spectral image of Darth Vader, Ren is confronted by similar visions of Luke, Han and Leia. While Ren vanquishes the vision of Luke, he finds himself unable to fully banish the image of his parents, who plead with him to return to the light.

The Rise of Kylo Ren (2019–2020)

Marvel Comics' The Rise of Kylo Ren depicts how Ben Solo fell to the dark side. As a child, he is trained as a Jedi by Luke Skywalker alongside fellow students Voe, Hennix, and Tai. Voe grows jealous of Ben for his superior Force capability and Luke's perceived favoritism. On a mission to the planet Elphrona to investigate an ancient Jedi outpost with Luke and Lor San Tekka, Ben telepathically communicates with Snoke. Upon arriving on the planet, the trio encounters a group of Force-wielding mercenaries known as the Knights of Ren (after their leader). After Ren agrees to retreat, he unmasks and, placing his mask on the ground, offers Ben an open invitation to the group's ranks if he ever desires in the future.

Several years later, Luke apparently tries to kill Ben in his sleep. Ben fights back and is terrified when a bolt of lightning strikes the Jedi Temple, destroying it. Later that night, Voe, Hennix, Tai return from off-planet to find Ben before the burning Temple. Ben confesses his belief that he has killed Luke, and states that he intends to leave the planet. Believing Ben to be responsible for the Temple's destruction, Voe attacks Ben, leading to Hennix being injured in the melee. Ben leaves the planet on a nearby shuttle, with the trio in close pursuit. Ben goes to meet Snoke, who is scarred from a previous encounter with Luke. Snoke encourages Ben to seek out the Knights of Ren. Traveling to the outpost on Elphrona, Ben retrieves Ren's mask and puts it on, putting the pair in communication. After mentioning Snoke, Ren invites Ben to meet the Knights on Vanrak. Before he can leave, he is confronted by his fellow Padawans.

Ben defends himself from Voe's attacks, and uses the Force to catch her after she falls off of a building. Hennix, believing Ben to have killed her, throws his lightsaber at Ben; in deflecting it, Hennix is bisected. Leaving, Ben collapses the bedrock around Voe and Tai and leaves the planet. Later, Ben meets with Ren and his Knights, who informs him that he will need to provide a "good death" for membership. Providing him with a black outfit, the group proceeds to the mine moon of Mimban, where Ben assists the Knights in stealing an artifact. The Knights subsequently execute a group of locals, horrifying Ben. Suddenly, Voe and Tai arrive, having followed Ben through the Force. Voe attacks the Knights of Ren, while Tai reasons with Ben over his decision to leave. Witnessing this, Ren snaps Tai's neck, killing him, and telling Ben that Snoke was wrong about him. Enraged, Ben duels Ren. Meanwhile, Rey senses Ben from across the galaxy without knowing why; Leia senses Ben's fall, and Palpatine manipulates events from afar, having apparently destroyed the Jedi Temple as well. Then, Ben impales Ren, providing him the "good death" he asked for.

Ben proceeds to kill Voe with Ren's lightsaber, then turns to find the Knights of Ren kneeling before him. Later, Ben bleeds his blue Kyber crystal, cracking it in the process, and forges himself a crossguard lightsaber as the voice of Snoke asks him what his new name is.

Other works
Kylo Ren is a point of view character in the 2015, 2017, and 2019 novelizations of the Star Wars sequel trilogy by Alan Dean Foster, Jason Fry, and Rae Carson.

Kylo is a playable character in the 2015 The Force Awakens add-on to the Disney Infinity 3.0 video game, with an Infinity character figurine available separately. He is also a character in the strategy video game Star Wars: Force Arena.

Hasbro has released a  Kylo Ren action figure, and a  figure in their Black Series line. He is also featured in the Lego Star Wars playsets Kylo Ren's Command Shuttle (2015) and Battle on Takodana (2016), as well as a Lego Buildable Figure. The Lego version of Kylo also appears in the 2016 short form animated series Lego Star Wars: The Resistance Rises, and as a playable character in Lego Star Wars: The Force Awakens.

In January 2016, Driver reprised the role for a Star Wars/Undercover Boss sketch on Saturday Night Live, with Kylo Ren disguising himself as a radar technician named "Matt" to determine what the Starkiller Base employees really think of him. Driver again reprised the role in January 2020 for a follow-up Saturday Night Live sketch titled “Undercover Boss: Where Are They Now?” in which Kylo goes undercover as “Randy,” an entry-level intern on a star destroyer.

In the 2017 Chuck Wendig novel Star Wars: Aftermath: Empire's End, Ben Solo is stated as having been born on the planet Chandrila on the same day as a peace treaty is signed between the remnants of the Empire and the New Galactic Republic (about a year after Return of the Jedi, or 29 years before The Force Awakens). Kylo Ren is also mentioned in the 2017 novel Star Wars: Phasma, which takes place before The Force Awakens.

Kylo appears in Star Wars Battlefront II, voiced by Matthew Wood and Roger Craig Smith, masked and unmasked respectively. In the game, Kylo interrogates Del Meeko about Lor San Tekka's location (who possess the map to Luke Skywalker) using his Force abilities. When Del finally relents and reveals the map and Lor San Tekka's location, Kylo leaves him for Hask, Del's former comrade in Inferno Squad.

Kylo Ren (voiced once again by Matthew Wood) also appears in the Star Wars: Resistance series finale episode "The Escape", where he kills Agent Tierny for failing to destroy the Colossus Resistance. Kylo Ren is also one of the numerous voices heard in the fourth and final season of Star Wars: Rebels in the episode "A World Between Worlds", with an excerpt of Driver's dialogue from The Force Awakens being used.

Kylo Ren appears as a walk-around character within Star Wars: Galaxy's Edge at Disneyland and Disney's Hollywood Studios. The character appears during Star Tours – The Adventures Continue and Star Wars: Rise of the Resistance, with the latter featuring the character in audio-animatronic form with Driver providing the voice.

Reception

The character and Driver's portrayal have received critical acclaim; Driver won the 2016 Saturn Award for Best Supporting Actor for his portrayal. In January 2018, Kylo was voted seventh greatest movie villain of all time by the readers of Empire.
Many reviewers commended Ren's conflicted nature and depth, as well as his costume design, and noted there were many places the character could be taken in future installments. Peter Bradshaw of The Guardian praised the character and the actor alike, saying, "He is gorgeously cruel, spiteful and capricious – and unlike the Vader of old, he is given to petulant temper tantrums, with his lightsaber drawn." Terri Schwartz of IGN also called Driver's performance "spectacular", noting that "his performance adds great depth to a character who could have come off as one-dimensional, and the implications of his arc leave a viewer with plenty to think about after they leave the theater." Collin wrote, "To describe Kylo Ren as this film's Vader would be accurate in a sense ... But it would also be to undersell the deep ingenuity with which this astonishing character has been crafted by Abrams, Kasdan and Arndt, and also the wells of emotional tumult Driver invests in him." Comparing the character to the one-note Vader of the 1977 film, Melissa Leon calls Ren "a living battleground between darkness and light, making him a far more resonant and familiar portrayal of that struggle than we've ever seen in Star Wars ... [which] makes him a far more interesting villain." Abrams told Entertainment Weekly, "it was a great joy to work with Adam Driver on this role, because he threw himself into it in a deep and remarkable way." Todd McCarthy of The Hollywood Reporter noted, "Ren is given a pronounced inferiority complex, a clever bad guy twist that could be taken to interesting places both in the writing and performance." Peter Travers of Rolling Stone wrote, "The bald-faced attempt to clone Vader, one of the greatest badasses in film history, is clankingly obvious, but Driver, masked and unmasked, gives him hypnotic and haunting contours." Kyle Buchanan of Vulture.com was underwhelmed by the reveal of Driver under the mask. Leon, however, argued:

Some viewers noted that Ren's character arc shares similarities with that of the Star Wars Expanded Universe character Jacen Solo, the son of Han Solo and Princess Leia who threatens the galaxy as a fallen Jedi. Additionally, critics have noted a resemblance between Ren's character design and that of Revan, the protagonist of Knights of the Old Republic.

Relationships

Family tree

Mentorship tree

References
Footnotes

Citations

Sources

Further reading

External links

 
 
 Kylo Ren on IMDb

Extraterrestrial supervillains
Film characters introduced in 2015
Fictional characters with alter egos
Fictional characters with disfigurements
Fictional characters with healing abilities
Fictional characters with precognition
Fictional commanders
Fictional defectors
Fictional dictators
Fictional energy swordfighters
Fictional henchmen
Fictional kidnappers
Fictional knights
Fictional mass murderers
Fictional military personnel in films
Fictional regents
Fictional patricides
Fictional regicides
Fictional soldiers
Fictional telekinetics
Fictional telepaths
Fictional torturers and interrogators
Fictional space pilots
Fictional war veterans
Film supervillains
Male characters in film
Male film villains
Star Wars characters who are Force-sensitive
Star Wars Resistance characters
Star Wars Skywalker Saga characters
Star Wars comics characters
Star Wars video game characters
Video game bosses